An anthotype is an image created using photosensitive material from plants. This  process was originally invented by Mary Somerville who presented her research to Sir John Herschel (who is often misquoted as the inventor) in 1842. An emulsion is made from crushed flower petals or any other light-sensitive plant, fruit or vegetable. A coated sheet of paper is then dried. Place some material, for example leaves or a transparent photo positive on the paper and expose to direct full sunlight until the image part not covered by the material is bleached out by the sun rays. The color remains  in the shadowed parts. The paper remains sensitive against such rays.

History
The photo-sensitive properties of plants and vegetables have been known to scholars for centuries. Among many early observations the experiments of Henri August Vogel in Paris are of particular interest. He discovered in 1816:

An alcoholic tincture of either red carnations, violets or corn poppy turned white behind blue glass in a few days, while it remained unchanged behind red glass after about the same time. Cotton and paper colored with these tinctures exhibited the same differences.

Later that century Herschel attempted to invent a color process, he tried several flower and plant emulsions and published his findings. His research resulted in the anthotype process. His research into making photographic images from flowers was limited and was ultimately abandoned since no commercial application was feasible from a process which takes days to produce an image. The process continued to be listed in photographic literature of the time but was likely little used.

Over time the process has earned a misleading reputation for being simply too impractical. Image permanence have been brought into question to this day but this problem seems to be mostly related to choice of flower or plant matter.

How it works

Other flower suggestions
Henry H. Snelling writes based on his research: "Viola odorata--or sweet scented violet, yields to alcohol a rich blue color, which it imparts in high perfection to paper. Senecio Splendens -- or double purple groundsel, yields a beautiful color to paper."

Bingham, quoting by Sir John Herschel, recommends Corchorus japonicus flower (japanese Jute) for a "fine yellow colour" that "upon exposure to sunlight, it is in about half an hour rendered quite white".

References 

 Heritage-Tilley, Clive.
 Snelling, Henry H. The History and Practice of the Art of Photography. New York, 1849.
 Eder, Josef.  The History of Photography.  Dover Press, 1978

External links 
Snelling, Henry H. The History and Practice of the Art of Photography. New York, 1849. on Gutenberg
 The anthotype process

Artistic techniques
Photographic processes dating from the 19th century